Cordylanthus ramosus is a species of flowering plant in the family Orobanchaceae known by the common name bushy bird's beak. It is native to the western United States where it grows in mountains and plateau, including the sagebrush of the Great Basin. It is an annual herb producing an erect, branching gray-green form, often tinted with red, becoming bushy at its most robust and appearing not unlike a sagebrush. The small leaves are narrow and linear or divided into several narrow, thready lobes. The inflorescence is a small spike of a few flowers surrounded by bracts which are linear or divided into narrow, thready lobes like the leaves. The bracts are faintly woolly and occasionally bristly in texture. The flower is one to two centimeters long with a hairy yellow pouch enclosed in darker, tougher reddish sepals. This plant had a number of historical medicinal uses for the Navajo people, who used it as an emetic.

References

External links
Jepson Manual Treatment
USDA Plants Profile
Photo gallery

ramosus
Plants used in traditional Native American medicine